Erik Nielson is Professor of Liberal Arts at the University of Richmond who has become well known as an expert in the use of rap music as evidence in criminal trials. His book Rap on Trial: Race, Lyrics, and Guilt in America, with co-author Andrea Dennis, was published in November 2019 and received the Hugh Hefner Foundation First Amendment Award in October 2020.  Nielson's research focuses on the relationship between African-American culture and policing, as well as the relationship between hip hop and politics. He has written for the New York Times and other mainstream news outlets on these issues. He was the lead author of three amicus briefs with the US Supreme Court, two of which were jointly submitted with his frequent collaborator, Killer Mike. Nielson and Travis L. Gosa edited The Hip Hop & Obama Reader.  Nielson was a featured participant in WRIC News' series Richmond and Race, a discussion among community leaders about race relations and police accountability in Richmond, VA.

References 

Living people
University of Richmond faculty
Year of birth missing (living people)